Sharmin Akhter Supta (born 31 December 1995) is a Bangladeshi cricketer who plays for the Bangladesh women's national cricket team. She plays as a right-handed batter.

Early life and background
Sharmin was born in Gaibanda, Bangladesh.

Career
Sharmin made her ODI debut against Ireland on 26 November 2011. Sharmin also made her T20I debut against Ireland, on 28 August 2012.

In October 2018, she was named in Bangladesh's squad for the 2018 ICC Women's World Twenty20 tournament in the West Indies. In November 2021, she was named in Bangladesh's team for the 2021 Women's Cricket World Cup Qualifier tournament in Zimbabwe.

In the second match of the World Cup qualifiers against the United States, Bangladeshi opener Sharmin Akter scored an unbeaten 130 runs from 141 deliveries to take Bangladesh to 322–5 at the end of 50 overs, where she hits 11 boundaries and she became the first ever centurion in ODIs for Bangladesh Women's cricket team. She achieved this milestone by playing her 26th match. Previours highest individual innings in ODI cricket was 75 runs.

In January 2022, she was named in Bangladesh's team for the 2022 Commonwealth Games Cricket Qualifier tournament in Malaysia. Later the same month, she was named in Bangladesh's team for the 2022 Women's Cricket World Cup in New Zealand.

References

External links
 
 

1995 births
Living people
People from Gaibandha District
Bangladeshi women cricketers
Bangladesh women Twenty20 International cricketers
Bangladesh women One Day International cricketers
Rangpur Division women cricketers
Dhaka Division women cricketers
Northern Zone women cricketers
Asian Games medalists in cricket
Cricketers at the 2014 Asian Games
Asian Games silver medalists for Bangladesh
Medalists at the 2014 Asian Games
IPL Trailblazers cricketers